Victor de Sigaldi (27 February 1892 – 23 June 1968) was a Monegasque sailor. He competed in the Star event at the 1952 Summer Olympics.

References

External links
 

1892 births
1968 deaths
Monegasque male sailors (sport)
Olympic sailors of Monaco
Sailors at the 1952 Summer Olympics – Star